Taylor Beck (born May 13, 1991) is a Canadian professional ice hockey forward currently playing for HC Sibir Novosibirsk of the Kontinental Hockey League (KHL). Previously, Beck had played with the New York Rangers, Edmonton Oilers, New York Islanders, and Nashville Predators organizations, with the latter having originally drafted him in 2009.

Playing career

Beck was drafted by the Nashville Predators in the third round, 70th overall, in the 2009 NHL Entry Draft. He was signed to a three-year entry level contract with the Predators on August 25, 2010.

During the lock-out shortened 2012–13 season, Beck received his first recall from the Milwaukee Admirals and made his NHL debut with the Predators in a 4–3 defeat to the Columbus Blue Jackets on March 19, 2013. In his third game with Nashville, also against the Blue Jackets, Beck scored his first NHL goal in a multi-point game victory on March 23, 2013.

Following the 2014–15 NHL season Beck became a restricted free agent under the NHL Collective Bargaining Agreement. The Nashville Predators made him a qualifying offer to retain his NHL rights and, on July 5, 2015, Beck filed for Salary Arbitration. On July 12, 2015, Beck's rights were traded to the Toronto Maple Leafs in exchange for forward Jamie Devane. He would sign a one year contract with the club the following day. On the eve of the Maple Leafs training camp, on September 17, 2015, Beck was again traded, along with a group of prospects, to the New York Islanders in exchange for  Michael Grabner.

Beck was later assigned by the Islanders to begin the 2015–16 season in the AHL with affiliate, the Bridgeport Sound Tigers. After a month in Bridgeport, Beck was recalled by the Islanders on October 31 made later made his debut with the club in a 2–1 defeat to the Boston Bruins on November 8, 2015. Beck remained on the Islanders roster for a month appearing in only 1 further game before he was re-assigned to the Sound Tigers on November 26, 2015. Beck added to the Bridgeport offence with 33 points in 46 games before he was dealt by the Islanders, for the third time within the year, to the Colorado Avalanche in exchange for Marc-André Cliche on February 29, 2016. He was directly assigned to remain in the AHL with the San Antonio Rampage.

At the conclusion of the season as a restricted free agent, Beck was not tendered a qualifying offer to remain with the Avalanche. As a free agent, Beck agreed to a one-year, two-way contract with the Edmonton Oilers on July 3, 2016. Assigned to affiliate, the Bakersfield Condors to begin the 2016–17 season, Beck led the team and was amongst the AHL scoring leaders before he was recalled to the Oilers. Beck appeared in 3 scoreless games with the Oilers before he was returned to the Condors. He amassed 50 points in just 40 games before he was dealt at the NHL trade deadline by the Oilers to the New York Rangers in exchange for Justin Fontaine on March 1, 2017. Beck continued scoring at a point-per-game pace with affiliate, the Hartford Wolf Pack, and featured in 2 regular season games with the Rangers to end the season. With 76 points in 56 games, Beck was selected to the AHL's First All-Star Team.

As an impending free agent, on June 13, 2017, Beck signed a one-year deal with Russian club, Avtomobilist Yekaterinburg, of the Kontinental Hockey League (KHL).

During the 2018–19 season, while in his second season with Kunlun Red Star, Beck continued his scoring pace with the club in notching 9 goals and 22 points through 39 games before he was traded to Avangard Omsk in exchange for the rights to Axel Holmström on December 27, 2018.

On June 4, 2020, during the off-season, Beck was traded by Omsk to Metallurg Magnitogorsk in exchange for Ilya Kablukov and Alexei Bereglazov. In the 2020–21 season, Beck acclimated quickly with Metallurg posting new KHL highs of 16 goals, 27 assists and 43 points in 56 regular season game while adding 10 points in 12 playoff contests.

As a free agent Beck opted to continue in the KHL, agreeing to a one-year contract with Belarusian based club, HC Dinamo Minsk, on June 23, 2021.

On July 17, 2022, Beck continued his well-travelled tenure in the KHL by joining his sixth club, HC Sibir Novosibirsk, on a one-year contract for the 2022–23 season.

Career statistics

Regular season and playoffs

International

Awards and honours

References

External links

1991 births
Living people
Avangard Omsk players
Avtomobilist Yekaterinburg players
Bakersfield Condors players
Bridgeport Sound Tigers players
HC Dinamo Minsk players
Edmonton Oilers players
Guelph Storm players
Hartford Wolf Pack players
Ice hockey people from Ontario
HC Kunlun Red Star players
Metallurg Magnitogorsk players
Milwaukee Admirals players
Nashville Predators draft picks
Nashville Predators players
New York Islanders players
New York Rangers players
San Antonio Rampage players
HC Sibir Novosibirsk players
Sportspeople from St. Catharines
Canadian ice hockey right wingers